The 4th International Film Festival of India was held from 5th to 18 December 1969 in New Delhi's hotel "Ashoka Convention Hall". 34 countries participated in the "4th IFFI" inaugurated by the then President of India V. V. Giri. The honors were classified under three sections - films as art, films as communication, and special short films from this edition featuring a total of 151 films. A nine member jury was chaired by Raj Kapoor, R. K. Narayan, and Swedish filmmaker Mai Zetterling.

Winners
Golden Peacock
Golden Peacock (Best Film): "The Damned" by Luchino Visconti (Italian film)
Golden Peacock (Best Short Film) "Taking off at 1800 Hours" (Cuban film)

Silver Peacock
Best Short Film "Man and the Crow" by Sugathapala Senarath Yapa (Srilankan film)
Special Jury Awards to Lester James Peries for "Golu Hadawatha" (Srilankan film); Mrinal Sen for "Bhuvan Shome" (Indian film); Sobhan Babu for "Bangaru Panjaram" (Indian film)

References

1969 film festivals
04
1969 in Indian cinema